You Won't Be Alone is a 2022 horror film written and directed by Goran Stolevski in his directorial debut. It stars Sara Klimoska, Anamaria Marinca, Alice Englert, Félix Maritaud, Carloto Cotta, and Noomi Rapace. in the movie, a naive peasant girl in 19th century Macedonia is taken from a sheltered life of solitude, turned into a shapeshifter by a witch, then abandoned. As the mute girl explores a world above ground for the first time, she learns about humanity, loss and love - but the witch is jealously watching, and her anger may tear the girl's world apart once more.

An international co-production of Australia, the United Kingdom, and Serbia, it premiered at the 2022 Sundance Film Festival in the World Cinema Dramatic Competition on 22 January 2022. The film was theatrically released on 1 April 2022 in the United States by Focus Features, via Universal Pictures.

Plot 
In 19th century Macedonia, Maria - a "Wolf-Eateress", or witch, with a horrible burned appearance - enters the home of a newborn baby. The child's terrified mother says that if Maria spares the girl's life, she will give her up once the girl is 16. Maria agrees, but robs the girl of her voice before leaving. The mother hides the child, Nevena, in a cave, and raises her there with no knowledge of the outside world.

On Nevena's 16th birthday, Maria arrives in the form of an eagle; the mother chases the bird out of sight, where Maria kills her and takes her form. She tells Nevena to follow her. Outside the cave, Maria kills a donkey, scratches Nevena's chest and spits the donkey's blood onto her before burning her wound with fire; this transforms Nevena into a witch, giving her retractible black talons on her fingers and palm. Maria then pulls Nevena's mother's guts from a hole in her chest, causing her to resume her previous, burned form.

Nevena, not understanding what has happened, believes the witch is still her mother. Maria kills a shepherd who takes a liking to Nevena, warning her that humans will hurt her, and tries to teach her to catch and kill rabbits and fish, whose blood witches consume for power. But Nevena would rather play with the creatures, and Maria, disgusted, mocks her for her delight. Angered, Nevena throws a stone at Maria, who abandons her to fend for herself. Nevena follows her for a little while until she sees Maria kill and assume the form of a wolf, putting its entrails into a cavity in her chest, before disappearing into the forest.

Nevena comes across a village, where she sees a young woman, Bosilka, giving birth to a baby. Attracted by its cries, Nevena finds the baby in a crib in the barn. Bosilka attacks her, and Nevena, shocked, accidentally kills her. Copying Maria, Nevena puts Bosilka's entrails into her chest and assumes her appearance; the spell also causes Bosilka's body to disappear.

Nevena, who is still mute, assumes Bosilka's life. Her family believe that she has gone mad, but Nevena slowly learns how to live as a human: how to cook and wash, how to communicate non-verbally, and the differences in how men and women treat her. All the while, Maria watches from afar.

One night, Boslika’s abusive husband tries to have sex with her. The unfamiliarity of the process, along with the rough nature of her husband, causes her to panic and kill him. She removes Bosilka's entrails from her chest cavity, reverts to her old self and flees.

On the road once more, she assumes the shape of a dog and comes across a group of men. She follows them to their village, then assumes her naked human form and lures one of them away. The man, Boris, attempts to seduce her and they begin to have sex, but she kills him and assumes his shape. Now a male, Nevena returns to the village, where he learns to plow the fields and thresh, but still acts in a confused and childlike way. His peculiar behaviour attracts the attention of the women of the village, who believe he is possessed. They attempt an exorcism, which they believe is successful, but say that the Wolf-Eateress that bewitched him will one day come back and spirit him away. Again, Maria appears to him and warns that growing close to normal humans won’t end well.

But Nevena persists, and enjoys his life in the village, even having a pleasurable sexual experience with a local woman. That changes when he discovers the body of a dying girl, Biliana, who has fallen from a cliff. Crying for the first time, Nevena sheds her male form and assumes that of the little girl, leaving only Boris's bloodstained clothes behind. Now appearing to be Biliana, she integrates herself back into the village. As time passes, she grows close to a boy, Yovan, who is seemingly also mute. One night she and the other children are told how, according to local legend, Maria came to be a witch.

Centuries ago, 'Old Maid Maria', ageing and unmarried, led a very repetitive life caring for her elderly father. One day she happened across a witch and begged her for a husband and child. The witch scratched her chest and spat blood in her face - the first two steps of creating a witch - before walking away. Later, Maria was approached by a man who offers his son's hand in marriage. She accepted, but upon arriving in his home discovered that the son was dying of disease. She was tied up and forced to have sex with him, because his mother didn't want him to die without having spread his seed.

Maria fell sick and attempted to drink a cow's blood to give her strength but was discovered and burned as a witch. The fire completed the witch's spell and transformed Maria into a witch herself - but only after her body had been left horribly burned and scarred.

For Nevena, many years pass, and she decides to marry the boy from her youth. As they grow closer, she reveals her witch's talons, but he is not afraid. They make love, and she becomes pregnant, but tragedy strikes when her husband is killed by a boar - implied to be Maria in disguise. The moment she gives birth to a baby girl, Nevena shuts herself away, afraid that Maria will take her newborn child, but the women of the village promise to protect it.

However, one chilly morning she discovers her midwife has been killed, and that Maria has seized her baby. The witch ridicules the child and Nevena before cutting its throat with her talon. Without stopping to think, Nevena kills a goat, takes a mouthful of its blood and performs the Wolf-Eateress spell on the dying infant, turning it into a witch and saving its life. Maria is astonished that Nevena could love the child so much that she would use up her one chance to make a witch without thinking. Nevena sets the child down then kills Maria.

As Maria dies, Nevena looks at her baby and remembers all the lives she has led.

Cast
 Sara Klimoska as Nevena
 Leontina Bainović as Young Nevena
 Anamaria Marinca as Maria
 Alice Englert as Biliana / Nevena #4
 Anastasija Karanovich as Young Biliana
 Sofija Jeremić as Biliana's Mother
 Daniel Kovacević as Biliana's Father
 Senka Kolozova as Biliana's Grandmother
 Jelena Velkovski as Biliana's Sister-in-Law
 Félix Maritaud as Jovan
 Danilo Savić as Young Jovan
 Carloto Cotta as Boris / Nevena #3
 Milena Nikolić as Boris' Wife
 Branislav Cubrilo as Boris' Father
 Noomi Rapace as Bosilka / Nevena #2
 Jasmina Avramović as Bosilka's Mother-in-Law
 Arta Dobroshi as Stamena
 Artan Sadiku as Stamena's Husband
 Predrag Vasić as Groom
 Verica Nedeska as Groom's Mother
 Nikola Marković as Groom's Father
 Mladen Vuković as Stojan
 Djordje Zivadinović Grgur as Young Stojan
 Djordje Misina as Miroslav
 Irena Ristić as Elica
 Kamka Toćinovski as Joana
 Viktorija Jakovljević as Little Girl
 Marija Opsenica as Ur-Witch
 Miloš Pantić as Dusan
 Teodor Vinćić as Vladimir
 Nikola Ristanovski as Milan
 Veselina Mihajlović as Midwife
 Djordje Koćić as Woodcutter

Production
In December 2020, it was announced Noomi Rapace, Anamaria Marinca, Alice Englert, Carloto Cotta, Félix Maritaud and Sara Klimoska had joined the cast of the film, with Goran Stolevski directing from a screenplay he wrote, with Focus Features set to distribute. Principal photography concluded by December 2020.

Release
The film premiered in the 2022 Sundance Film Festival on 22 January 2022 in the World Cinema Dramatic Competition section. It is also selected in Bucheon Choice Features section at 26th Bucheon International Fantastic Film Festival and was screened on 10 July 2022.

It was originally scheduled to be released in the United States on 28 January 2022, but it was delayed to 1 April 2022. It premiered on the American streaming service Peacock in May 2022. It was released in Australia on 22 September 2022.

Reception

Box office
In the United States and Canada, the film earned $124,750 from 147 theaters in its opening weekend. It added $49,750 (a drop of 60%) in its second weekend.

Critical response
The film received critical acclaim from critics.  On Metacritic, the film has a score of 80 out of 100 based on reviews from 32 critics, indicating "generally favorable reviews."

Awards and nominations
The film was selected and submitted as Australia's official entry for the Best International Film category at the 95th Academy Awards in 2023.

References

External links
 

2022 directorial debut films
2022 horror films
Australian horror films
British horror films
Serbian horror films
Focus Features films
Films set in the 19th century
Films set in North Macedonia
Macedonian-language films
2020s British films
Films directed by Goran Stolevski
Universal Pictures films